The 2019 MBC Drama Awards, presented by Munhwa Broadcasting Corporation (MBC) took place on December 30, 2019. It was hosted by Kim Sung-joo and Han Hye-jin.

Winners and nominees
Winners denoted in bold.

Presenters

Special performances

See also
2019 KBS Drama Awards
2019 SBS Drama Awards

References

External links
 

2019 television awards
MBC Drama Awards
2019 in South Korean television